Robert Bernard Meinke (June 25, 1887 – December 29, 1952) was an American baseball shortstop who appeared in 2 games for the Cincinnati Reds in . He batted and threw right-handed.

His father, Frank Meinke, played for the Detroit Wolverines of the National League from 1884–1885.

See also
List of second-generation Major League Baseball players

External links

1887 births
1952 deaths
Major League Baseball shortstops
Baseball players from Chicago
Cincinnati Reds players
St. Joseph Drummers players